First Kiss is a 1998 South Korean romantic drama film directed by Kim Tae-kyun and produced by Jeong Tae-won.

Cast
 Ahn Jae-wook
 Choi Ji-woo
 Lee Geung-young
 Yu Hye-kyeong
 Byun Woo-min
 Jang Dong-gun
 Jin Jae-yeong
 Shin Cheol-jin as Elevator man	
 Kim Bo-sung
 Ko So-young
 Lee Jong-soo
 Lee Young-ae

References

External links
 

1998 films
1998 romantic drama films
South Korean romantic drama films
1990s Korean-language films